The  is  a list of mountains on the Moon, arranged by relative height in kilometres.

More than four kilometres
Mons Huygens - 5.5 km
Mons Hadley - 4.5 km
Mons Bradley - 4.3 km

3-4 kilometres
Mons Penck - 4.0 km
Mons Hadley Delta - 3.9 km
Mons Blanc - 3.8 km
Mons Wolff - 3.8 km
Mons Ampère - 3.3 km

2-3 kilometres
Mons Pico - 2.4 km
Mons Piton - 2.1 km
Mons Vitruvius - 2.3 km

1-2 kilometres
Mons La Hire - 1.5 km
Mons Vinogradov - 1.4 km	
Mons Maraldi - 1.3 km
Mons Rümker - 1.1 km

Less than one kilometre
Mons Gruithuisen Gamma - 0.9 km

See also

 List of mountains on the Moon
 Boot Hill
 Duke Island
 List of tallest mountains in the Solar System

Notes

 
Moon, by height
Mountains